Route 100E (or Airport shuttle bus) is a bus route in Budapest. The line currently runs between the Budapest Ferenc Liszt International Airport and the Deák Ferenc tér (city centre). It is operated by ArrivaBus. This bus is only available with the Airport shuttle bus single ticket, which costs 1500 HUF, no other types of tickets or passes are valid. The shuttle line was suspended on 1 April 2020 due to travel restrictions caused by COVID-19 pandemic.

History
Route 100E was introduced on July 8, 2017, a few days before the 17th FINA World Championships. Frequency and operating hours have been extended since 18 May 2018.

As of August 2022, 100E operates continuously (24/7).

Route

Stops and connections

References 

100E